The Assassin's Code, previously entitled Legacy, is an American thriller film directed by David A. Armstrong and written by Edward Lee Cornett and Valerie Grant. The film stars Justin Chatwin, Peter Stormare and Mark Thompson. The film was released on May 11, 2018, in a limited release and through video on demand by Gravitas Ventures.

Cast 
 Justin Chatwin as Detective Michael Connelly
 Peter Stormare as Kurt Schlychter
 Mark Thompson as Captain Jack O'Brien
 Robin Thomas as Angelo Leonetti
 Yancy Butler as Laura Consolo
 Rich Grosso as Carmen Puccinaldi
 Elizabeth Anweis as Jia Connelly
 Dontez James as David Paris
 Matt O'Shea as Jimmy Marco
 Christopher Mele as Detective Brandt
 Allen O'Reilly as Steve Kitchen
 Jordan Whalen as Keller Abrams
 Melvin Bender as Ray Blaine
 Greg Violand as Kenny Cohen
 Lauren Ashley Berry as Detective Harris
 Edward Lee Cornett as Albert

Production 
The film was shot in Cleveland. Principal photography began on October 24, 2016, and ended on November 19.

Story and characters created by Edward Lee Cornett

Release
The Assassin's Code premiered at the Cleveland International Film Festival on April 12, 2018. Gravitas Ventures acquired the domestic distribution rights and released the film on May 11, 2018, in select theaters and through video on demand.

References

External links

 

2018 thriller films
2018 films
American thriller films
2010s English-language films
2010s American films